Davar Dar Mian-e Sofla (also Romanized as Dāvar Dar Mīān-e Soflá; also known as Davār Bamīān, Davār Dar Mīān, and Dāvar Dar Mīān) is a village in Mansuri Rural District, Homeyl District, Eslamabad-e Gharb County, Kermanshah Province, Iran. At the 2006 census, its population was 148, in 31 families.

References 

Populated places in Eslamabad-e Gharb County